William H. "Dutch" Hollander (December 9, 1891 – February 22, 1947) was American football, basketball, and baseball coach and minor league baseball player. He served as the head football coach at Saint Mary's College of California in 1920, compiling a record of 0–3. Hollander was the head basketball coach at Stetson University in Deland, Florida from 1915 to 1917 and the University of California, Berkeley from 1918 to 1920, amassing a career college basketball coaching record of 40–19. He was also the head baseball coach at Stetson from 1916 to 1917, tallying a mark of 21–10.

Holland died of a heart attack, on February 22, 1947, in San Francisco, California.

Head coaching record

Football

References

External links
 
 

1891 births
1947 deaths
Albany Senators players
American men's basketball players
Baseball outfielders
Baseball third basemen
Basketball coaches from Pennsylvania
Baseball players from Pennsylvania
Basketball players from Pennsylvania
California Democrats
California Golden Bears men's basketball coaches
College football officials
Fort Smith Twins players
Fort Worth Panthers players
Georgetown Hoyas baseball players
Georgetown Hoyas men's basketball players
Montgomery Rebels players
Oakland Oaks (baseball) players
Sacramento Senators players
Saint Mary's Gaels football coaches
Scranton Miners players
Sportspeople from York, Pennsylvania
Stetson Hatters baseball coaches
Stetson Hatters men's basketball coaches
Stetson University College of Law alumni
Toronto Maple Leafs (International League) players